Antioch University is a private university with multiple campuses in the United States and online programs. Founded in 1852 as Antioch College, its first president was politician, abolitionist, and education reformer Horace Mann. It changed its name to Antioch University in 1977 to reflect its growth across the country into numerous graduate education programs. It now operates four campuses located in three states, as well as an online division and the Graduate School of Leadership and Change. All campuses of the university are regionally accredited by the Higher Learning Commission. Campuses are located in Los Angeles, California; Santa Barbara, California; Keene, New Hampshire; and, Seattle, Washington. Additionally, Antioch University houses two institution-wide programs, the Graduate School of Leadership and Change and Antioch University Online. Antioch University suspended operations of Antioch College in 2008, and later sold the campus and a license to use the name "Antioch College" in 2009. Since then, the college has had no affiliation with the university.

History
Antioch University was incorporated in Ohio in 1852 and was originally known as Antioch College. Antioch University, continuously existence since 1852, has been continuously accredited by the Higher Learning Commission since 1927. In 1977, Antioch changed its name to "Antioch University," having extended its operations beyond the college and beyond Ohio, mostly in graduate level programs.

Antioch's first president was Horace Mann, regarded by most education historians as the father of public education in the United States. He had recently been successful in opening the first common schools in the state of Massachusetts to provide free, universal, non-sectarian education to citizens without regard to gender, race, or creed. He was recruited by the board of trustees of the newly formed Antioch College and came to Antioch from Boston. 

Antioch's curriculum included the traditional treatment of the classics, but would emphasize science and the scientific method, history, and modern literature. Students would not compete for grades but would be encouraged to pursue issues of interest to them, read what they considered worthwhile and present papers on topics of their own choosing. Antioch was one of the first institutions of higher education to admit black students.

Antioch began a period of rapid expansion in 1964 with the acquisition of the Putney School of Education in Vermont. That campus has evolved and moved several times to become Antioch University New England now situated in Keene, NH. By 1972, another 23 campuses and centers had been opened, and the college by-laws were revised to define Antioch as a "network", not a college. Even as centers began to close, new centers continued to open; 38 centers would be opened by the end of 1979, including the ABA-accredited Antioch University School of Law located in Washington, D.C. In 1977, the Antioch College board of trustees voted to change its corporate name to Antioch University and filed an amendment to its articles of incorporation on December 23, 1977. It continued to operate Antioch College as a division of the university along with the other campuses and centers. From 1978 to 1994 the president of the Antioch College campus also served as the Chancellor of Antioch University. Thereafter, the university transitioned to a separate University Chancellor, with a President or Provost leading each campus or division.

Over the next decade, the university had decided to close all but six of its Antioch network of operating units around the country. The last closures included Antioch University Philadelphia, Antioch University West, in San Francisco, and the Antioch School of Law. The remaining campuses included its original campus, Antioch College in Yellow Springs, Ohio; Antioch University New England in Keene New Hampshire; Antioch University Los Angeles; Antioch University Santa Barbara; Antioch University Seattle; and Antioch University McGregor, in Yellow Springs, Ohio, now known as Antioch University Midwest. In 2002, Antioch University's launched its Ph.D. in Leadership and Change program. The program is designed to educate professionals from a wide range of fields to understand and lead organizational change. The program's low-residency model offers students interdisciplinary study with a practitioner focus that teaches and encourages applied research. In 2013, Antioch launched Antioch Online, its distance learning division, with a BA degree completion program and a Masters of Human Services Administration.

In 2008, due to financial exigency, Antioch University closed the Antioch College campus in Yellow Springs. In 2009, a number of Antioch College alumni formed a new Ohio corporation, Antioch College Continuation Corporation, which purchased from the University the college campus along with an exclusive license to use the University's registered trade name "Antioch College". The new independent Antioch College opened in 2011. Since then, Antioch University and Antioch College have operated as wholly separate, non-affiliated institutions, although with a shared history. Antioch College is a residential, liberal arts, undergraduate institution for traditional age students, while Antioch University is focused on adult learners and offers primarily graduate level degrees, along with a bachelor's degree completion program.

From its inception, racial and gender equality, independent study, and independent thinking were integral parts of Antioch College. Six students were accepted for the first quarter: four men and two women who came to share the same college classrooms for the first time in the U.S. The notion of gender equality extended also to the faculty. Antioch College was the first U.S. college to designate a woman as full professor, and the original faculty included seven men and two women. In 1863, the college instituted the policy that no applicant was to be rejected on the basis of race.

In the early 1850s, Rebecca Pennell offered a course on teaching methods which was the first of its kind, while John Burns Weston, class of 1857, established a long-standing precedent by being both student and faculty simultaneously. He taught Greek language and literature for 20 years and remained a lifelong student.

Antioch President Arthur Morgan launched Antioch's unique program of work and study. Morgan also initiated student government and changed the nature of the admissions procedure, moving away from exams and towards more personal information on prospective students. In addition, senior exams were graded "honors" or "pass," and students who failed could retake the exam. Morgan remained at Antioch until 1933, when President Roosevelt requested that he assume directorship of the Tennessee Valley Authority Project.

Campuses

Antioch University New England
Founded in 1964, Antioch University New England is located in Keene, New Hampshire, a small city with a strong tradition of civic, social, and environmental activism, in the heart of the state's Monadnock Region. It is Antioch University's second largest campus, with over 1,200 graduate-level students. Master's degrees are awarded in areas of Clinical Mental Health Counseling (with specializations in Addictions Counseling & Dance/Movement Therapy), Marriage and Family Therapy, Environmental Studies, and Education. Doctoral degrees are awarded in the areas of Clinical Psychology (Psy.D.), Marriage and Family Therapy (Ph.D), and Environmental Studies (Ph.D). Antioch-New England is one of only three schools in the United States to offer Waldorf teacher training and has gained critical acclaim for its annually published environmental literary journal Whole Terrain.

Antioch University Los Angeles
Established in 1972 and with more than 8,000 alumni, Antioch University Los Angeles is the largest of the University's campuses with both undergraduate and graduate programs. It serves the diverse communities of the greater Los Angeles area. The core values of social justice, service to the community, and lifelong learning comprise the heart of all its programs. The school offers undergraduate degree completion programs in Liberal Studies, Applied Studies, Applied Arts and Media, Urban Communities and Justice, and Applied Technology and Business Leadership, and graduate programs in Nonprofit Management, Education and Teacher Credentialing, Psychology, Creative Writing, and Urban Sustainability. Partnerships with community organizations provide students with unique experiential learning opportunities. The low-residency MFA in creative writing was named among the top five programs in the nation by The Atlantic, and the graduate clinical psychology specialization in LGBT studies is the first of its kind. The MA in urban sustainability was developed in response to the growing awareness of the interconnections among environmental, economic, and social issues.

Antioch University Santa Barbara
Founded in 1977, Antioch University Santa Barbara enrolls approximately 270 adult students from Santa Barbara and surrounding counties, as well as assorted students from other regions of the United States and some foreign countries. The campus offers a BA in liberal studies with seven possible concentrations, MA in clinical psychology with two possible concentrations, a PsyD in clinical psychology, an MA in education and teaching credential program, and an MBA program, and a Women and Leadership Certificate program.

Antioch University Seattle
Antioch University Seattle (AUS), founded in 1975 in Seattle, Washington, offers master's degrees, a BA completion program, a Doctor of Clinical Psychology (PsyD) (APA accredited), and a Ph.D in Counselor Education and Supervision. Between 800 and 1000 students attend AUS, with an average age of 35. The School of Applied Psychology, Counseling and Family Therapy is the largest and longest running program with close to 3,000 graduates since 1976. The school offers master's degrees in mental health counseling, integrative studies, child, couple and family therapy, art therapy and drama therapy in addition to the PsyD program. The Center for Programs in Education offers teacher preparation at the graduate level, plus a master's in education for experienced educators. The Center for Creative Change features a low-residency, interdisciplinary approach to learning and offers master's degrees in environment and community, management and leadership, organizational development, and whole systems design. The BA in Liberal Studies program attracts students who like an individualized approach to completing their undergraduate degree. Students can receive credit for life experience and may pursue subjects of particular interest to them.

Antioch University Midwest 
Antioch University Midwest (AUM) was located in Yellow Springs, Ohio. Antioch University Midwest was known as Antioch University McGregor and founded in 1988 as the School of Adult and Experiential Learning at Antioch College.

Yellow Springs is now the home campus for many of the University's low-residency programs which attract students from across the country, including its PhD in Leadership and Change, its EdD in Education and Professional Practice, and its Master degree in Clinical Mental Health Counseling. AUM's functions were absorbed into AU Online, and its building put up for sale. However, university administration, AU Online and AU’s Graduate School of Leadership & Change remained headquartered in Yellow Springs, leaving about 25 employees.

University-wide programs

Graduate School of Leadership and Change
The PhD in Leadership and Change program is intended for working professionals in the interdisciplinary study, research and practice of leading positive change in workplaces, schools, organizations, and communities. The Master in Leadership Practice is intended to develop the specialized skills to lead organizational change and develop strategies to address challenging problems and achieve goals. Professional certificates are also offered in specialized areas after three week online courses.

Antioch University Online
Antioch University Online is a 100% online learning environment offering bachelor's completion degrees and graduate programs.

Antioch College separation and reorganization
In June 2007, the Antioch University board of trustees announced that they would suspend operations of Antioch College the following year and that they intended to re-open the college in four years. It was their belief that four years would give the university the necessary time to develop and execute a plan for re-building Antioch College in a manner that would both honor its legacy and secure its future.

There was considerable controversy among members of the Antioch College alumni group about the decision to suspend operations at the college. Subsequently, a group of Antioch College alumni, headed by the Antioch College Alumni Board, expressed interest in purchasing the college from the university and re-opening the college as an independent institution. The alumni group formed the Antioch College Continuation Corporation as the vehicle for negotiating and owning the college. After two years of negotiations, the parties agreed to terms of an asset purchase agreement which was signed at a closing ceremony on September 4, 2009. In the transaction, Antioch College Continuation Corporation purchased from the University the college campus in Yellow Springs, Ohio along with an exclusive license to use the University's registered trade name "Antioch College". However, Antioch University continues to own the trade name and any other use of the word "Antioch" within higher education.

References

External links
 Official website

 
Educational institutions established in 1978
Education in Greene County, Ohio
1978 establishments in California
Private universities and colleges in Ohio
Universities and colleges accredited by the Higher Learning Commission